The Quille du Diable (lit. "devil's skittle"; also known as Tour St-Martin) is a peak of the Diablerets massif, located on the border of the municipalities of Conthey and Savièse in the canton of Valais. It lies on the edge of the high Tsanfleuron Glacier plateau and overlooks the valley around of Derborence  lower.

At the foot of the Quille du Diable is the restaurant Refuge l'Espace. It can be reached by crossing the Tsanfleuron Glacier from the Scex Rouge mountain station.

References

External links 
The Quille du Diable
Refuge l'Espace

Mountains of Valais
Mountains of the Alps
Bernese Alps
Mountains of Switzerland
Two-thousanders of Switzerland